Büren an der Aare railway station is a railway station in the municipality of Büren an der Aare, in the Swiss canton of Bern. It is the northern terminus of the standard gauge  of Swiss Federal Railways.

Services 
The following services stop at Büren an der Aare:

References

External links 

 
 

Railway stations in the canton of Bern
Swiss Federal Railways stations